Luigi Merci or Louis Mercy (c. 1695–c. 1750) was an English composer of the Baroque era.

Merci was born around 1695 in England, probably into a French-English family, and died in London around 1750. He was engaged around 1720 in the musical chapel of James Brydges, Earl of Carnarvon and Duke of Chandos. In 1730 he married Ann Hampshire and settled in Covent Garden. In collaboration with the recorder maker Thomas Stanesby (1692–1754), he tried to improve the recorder, which at that time was in danger of disappearing in favour of the transverse flute.

Works
Three books of six sonatas each were published by John Walsh in London.

 6 Sonatas for flute and basso continuo op.1 
 6 Sonatas for flute and basso continuo op.2
 6 Sonatas for bassoon or cello and basso continuo op.3 (1735)

References

1690s births
1750 deaths
Year of birth uncertain
Year of death uncertain
18th-century British composers
English Baroque composers
Composers for flute